Stilbe (Ancient Greek: Στίλβη Stílbē) in Greek mythology may refer to the following personages: 

 Stilbe, mother of Callisto by Ceteus.
Stilbe, a nymph, daughter of the river god Peneus and the Naiad Creusa. She bore Apollo twin sons, Centaurus, ancestor of the Centaurs, and Lapithus, ancestor of the Lapiths. In another version of the myth, Centaurus was instead the son of Ixion and Nephele. Aineus, father of Cyzicus, was also said to have been a son of Apollo and Stilbe. By Cychreus, she became mother of the nymph Chariclo, wife of Chiron. 
 Stilbe, daughter of Eosphoros and a possible mother of Autolycus by Hermes.

Notes

References 

 Diodorus Siculus, The Library of History translated by Charles Henry Oldfather. Twelve volumes. Loeb Classical Library. Cambridge, Massachusetts: Harvard University Press; London: William Heinemann, Ltd. 1989. Vol. 3. Books 4.59–8. Online version at Bill Thayer's Web Site
 Diodorus Siculus, Bibliotheca Historica. Vol 1-2. Immanel Bekker. Ludwig Dindorf. Friedrich Vogel. in aedibus B. G. Teubneri. Leipzig. 1888-1890. Greek text available at the Perseus Digital Library.
 Fowler, Robert L., Early Greek Mythography. Volume 2: Commentary. Oxford University Press. Great Clarendon Street, Oxford, OX2 6DP, United Kingdom. 2013. 
Gaius Julius Hyginus, Fabulae from The Myths of Hyginus translated and edited by Mary Grant. University of Kansas Publications in Humanistic Studies. Online version at the Topos Text Project.
 M. Grant and J. Hazel, Who's Who in Greek Mythology, David McKay & Co Inc, 1979

Nymphs
Children of Peneus
Women of Apollo
Arcadian mythology